"Rainbow in the Dark" is a song by heavy metal band Dio. Released from the band's double platinum-selling 1983 debut album, Holy Diver.  Assisted by a popular MTV music video, it reached #12 on US Billboard Album Rock Tracks in early October.

The song was covered by Corey Taylor, with support from Roy Mayorga, Satchel, Christian Martucci and Jason Christopher for the Ronnie James Dio – This Is Your Life album. It was also covered by Norwegian band Jorn on their 2016 album Heavy Rock Radio.

The song was also featured in the 2019 San Diego Comic Con reveal of Marvel Studios' Thor: Love and Thunder, and is featured in end credits of the film itself.

Music video
The music video was filmed close to the time of the original studio recording of the song. The video's location takes place in central London, with scenes alternating between shots of a man following a woman through a street lined with pornographic cinemas, and Ronnie James Dio singing from a rooftop. The implied malicious intent of the man is made evident during the guitar solo, when guitarist Vivian Campbell (and late bassist Jimmy Bain) appear and effectively "scare" him away after he follows the woman into a moviehouse, with the woman kissing Campbell on the cheek in apparent gratitude. The video includes shots of tourist attractions such as Nelson's Column, Westminster Bridge, Piccadilly Circus, and Soho.

Chart positions

References

1983 singles
Dio (band) songs
Songs written by Vivian Campbell
Songs written by Ronnie James Dio
1983 songs
Songs written by Jimmy Bain
Vertigo Records singles
Warner Records singles
Songs written by Vinny Appice
Glam metal songs

sv:Rainbow in the Dark